This is a list of ships of the line of the United States Navy.  Because of the operating expense, a number of these were never launched.
These ships were maintained on the stocks, sometimes for decades, in case of an urgent need.

Continental Navy

   (given to France upon launching, 1782)
 Unnamed class
 Unnamed, Boston (canceled, 1778)
 Unnamed, Philadelphia (abandoned with the capture of Philadelphia, 1777)
 Unnamed, Poughkeepsie, New York (canceled, unknown date)

United States Navy

 Columbus class
 Columbus (canceled, 1800)
 Unnamed, Boston Navy Yard (canceled, 1800)
 Unnamed, New York Navy Yard (canceled, 1800)
 Franklin (canceled, 1800)
 Unnamed, Washington Navy Yard (canceled, 1800)
 Unnamed, Norfolk Navy Yard (canceled, 1800)
 
  (1814–1912, razeed 1836)
  (1814–1843)
  (1815–1852)
  (1819–1861)
 
  (laid down 1815, never completed)
  (laid down 1815, never completed)
  (1837–1861)
 
  (1820–1861)  
  (1848–1901)
  (launched as depot ship, 1864; training ship, 1892–1921)
  (laid down 1822, never launched)
  (laid down 1820; never launched; burnt on ways, 1861)
  (1820–1861)
  (1820–1866)
 Unnamed class
Not built, Boston Navy Yard (frames on hand, 1832; not built)
 Not built, Boston Navy Yard (frames on hand, 1832; not built)
 Not built, Norfolk Navy Yard (frames on hand, 1832; not built)
 Not built, Norfolk Navy Yard (frames on hand, 1832; not built)

References

Ships of the line
Ships of the line
United States Navy ships of the line
Ships of the line
United States Navy